Continental Classics is a series of books.

Contents

 Volume I
Taras Bulba: A Tale of the Cossacks by Nicolai V. Gogol translated by Isabel F. Hapgood

 Volume II
Sebastopol by Leo Tolstoy

Volume III
The Crushed Flower and Other Stories, by Leonid Andreev translated by Herman Bernstein.

Volume IV
The Career of a Nihilist by S. Stepniak [pseud.]

 Volume V 
Parisian points of view by Ludovic Halevy translated by Edith V. B. Matthews, with an introduction by Brander Matthews.

 Volume VI 
The Crime of Sylvestre Bonnard (Member of the institute) by Anatole France, translation and introduction by Lafcadio Hearn.

 Volume VII & Volume VIII
For the Right by Karl Emil Franzos translated by Julie Sutter.  Preface by George MacDonald.

 Volume IX 
Black Diamonds by Maurus Jokai translated by Frances A. Gerard.

 Volume X
Dame Care (Frau Sorge) by Hermann Sudermann tr. from the German by Bertha Overbeck.

 Volume XIThe New god, A Tale Of The Early Christians by Richard Voss

 Volume XII and XIII
Debit and Credit by Gustav Freytag, translated from German by L. C. C., with a preface by Christian Charles Josias Bunsen.

 Volume XIV Spanish, Italian and Oriental tales, including stories by I. M. Palmarini, Camillo Boito, Antonio Fogazzaro and Pedra de Alarcon. 

 Volume XVModern Ghosts, with introduction by George William Curtis.

 Volume XVI 
The house by the medlar-tree by Giovanni Verga translated by Mary A. Craig with an introduction by W. D. Howells.

 Volume XVIIThe battle of Waterloo and other stories, by Alexander Kielland, translated from Norwegian by William Archer, with an introduction by H. H. Boyesen.  Includes:
 Pharoh The Parsonage The Peat Moor "Hope's clad in April green" At the fair Two friends A good conscience Romance and Reality Withered leaves The battle of Waterloo Volume XVIII Mystery tales, reprint of The Lock and Key Library: North Europe Stories, by Julian Hawthorne.  Includes:
 The Queen of Spades, Pushkin
 The General's Will, Vera Jelihovsky
 Crime and Punishment, Fyoodor Dostoyevsky
 The Safety Match, Anton Chekhoff
 Knights of Industry, Vsevolod Krestovski
 The Amputated Arms, Jorgen Wilhelm Bergsoe
 The Manuscript, Otto Larssen
 The Sealed Room, Bernhard Ingemann
 The Rector of Veilbye, Steen Steensen Blicher
 The Living Death, Ferencz Molnar
 Thirteen at Table, Maurus Jokai
 The Dancing Bear, Etienne Barsony
 The Tower Room, Arthur Elck

Volume XIXDanish folk talesVolume XXThe wonderful adventures of Nils''

Notes 

Series of books